Vivienne Tam (born 28 November 1957) is a fashion designer based in New York City. She was born in Guangzhou, Guangdong, China, and moved to Hong Kong at the age of three. She attended the Hong Kong Polytechnic University.

Tam's fashion brand is named after her and is inspired by Chinese culture, design, modern fashion, and east–west fusion. The theme of her first collection was EAST WIND CODE.
She authored China Chic, a book in which she explored the ways in which Chinese style meets Western style and described elements of the Chinese culture like her mother's cheongsam that had the most impact on her. She also discussed how Chinese culture intertwined with Western style and influenced her future work. She has worked with Hewlett Packard on a special Vivienne Tam range of designer netbook computers, such as a version of the HP Mini 1000 and the HP Mini 210. Tam also appeared on dressup site Stardoll where she has her own suite and brand name. She has also designed dresses for the characters in the Animax movie LaMB.

The designer debuted her collaboration with Chinese jewelry brand TSL at her Spring 2013 fashion show.

Early life 
Vivienne Tam was born in Guangzhou, Guangdong, China. When Tam was three years old, her family left the People's Republic of China and moved to Hong Kong. The experiences of Vivienne's parents as wealthy landowners during Mao Zedong's rule influenced designer's future collections and inspired her to create her signature "MAO" collection. Vivienne discovered her love of fashion at an early age.  She was inspired by watching her mother making clothes for her family.  By the age of 8, she was making her own outfits and dressing herself and her siblings, even for Lunar New Year. She attended a Catholic school, where she learned English, even though she still spoke Cantonese at home with her family. She then went to study fashion design in Hong Kong Polytechnic University where she received her Higher Diploma in Fashion Design.

Work 
After finishing her degree she moved to New York City to launch her business. Her company, East Wind Code, was established in March 1982. (East Wind Code means "good luck and prosperity" in Chinese) Her clothes were being made in Hong Kong, however she had a work space on West 38th Street, NYC.  After a decade, she ended up changing the name of her business to "Vivienne Tam" before her first runway show at New York Fashion Week.

The East-West fusion 
In the world of fashion, Vivienne Tam is known for her "East meets West" designs. Her life in Hong Kong and family history in China made Tam a "bridge between two cultures." Tam believes that the world is ruled by the yin-yang philosophy, so her collections often reflect this belief, merging the traditional and modern cultures.

Through her works, the designer wanted to spread awareness in the West about the beauty of Chinese culture and national clothing. Vivienne's Tam collections highlight the unique character of Chinese culture. She uses them as a tool to show that Chinese national clothing is not just clothing but also a type of art, creativity, and a reflection of years of history.

Works and collections
Her first few collections were heavily influenced by traditional Chinese prints, fabrics, and designs. Her clothes were popular among fashion-forward women interested in Asian influence designs.

MAO
In 1995, she teamed up with artist Zhang Hongtu for her collection "MAO". Both Vivienne Tam's and Zhang Hongtu's families were denounced by Mao's regime, so their joint collection signifies "a kind of mental therapy," as Zhang puts it. The collection included several portraits of Mao that depicted him in comical light. For example, one of the images "Mao so Young" shows him with pigtails and gingham dress, and another image called "Ow Mao" shows Mao with a bee on his nose. The designer produced a series of printed t-shirts with these humorous images. Another collection included garments inspired by "Zhongshan suit", also known as the "Mao suit", since Mao regularly wore suits with the similar style. These suits featured black-and-white images of Mao that fully covered the garment. Vivienne Tam regarded this collection as "more serious, symbolizing the positive and negative effects Mao had on the Chinese culture"  In the Asian American community this created some controversy as they felt it was in poor taste, since many had died under his power. She even had difficulty finding a manufacturer in Hong Kong that would take the job, and even several minor protests by her store. Despite the controversy in the launching of this collection, some of the pieces became permanent artworks in the Andy Warhol Museum in Pittsburgh, Pennsylvania, and even in the collections of the Los Angeles's Fashion Institute of Design and Merchandising Museum, the Texas Fashion Collection, and New York's Museum at the Fashion Institute of Technology.

Year of the Dragon 
This following collection was inspired from Asian Culture, and released in Spring of 2001, featuring images of Buddha. She explained that "The Buddha image has always been in the temple, and I wanted to make it more accessible to the people."

Expansion of her business 
In 1996, she expanded her clothing empire and created a shoe line for Candie's, and the year after she opened her first store in NYC, then a branch in LA, Tokyo, and Kobe, Japan.

2017 spring collection 
In Fall of 2016, Tam debuted her Spring and Summer collection at New York Fashion Week featuring iconic Houston logos. Tam partnered with Visit Houston and Asian Wives Club to promote a new perspective on the city of Houston.

2018 fall/winter collection 
In February 2018, Tam presented her Fall/Winter 2018 collection, inspired by a "spiritual journey" through the Himalayas to Tibet, in Gallery I of Spring Studios.

See also
 Chinese Americans in New York City

References

Further reading

External links 

 
 
 
 
 
 
 

1956 births
Living people
Alumni of the Hong Kong Polytechnic University
American fashion businesspeople
American fashion designers of Chinese descent
American fashion designers
American women in business
Artists from Guangzhou
Artists from New York City
Businesspeople from New York City
High fashion brands
Hong Kong emigrants to the United States
Hong Kong fashion designers
Chinese women company founders
Businesspeople from Guangzhou
20th-century Chinese businesswomen
20th-century Chinese businesspeople
21st-century Chinese businesswomen
21st-century Chinese businesspeople
Hong Kong women fashion designers
American women fashion designers
21st-century American women